Bhisho Airport (IATA airport code: BIY, ICAO airport code: FABE) is a local airport in Eastern Cape, South Africa, which serves Bhisho and King William's Town. The airport lies on the right side of the N2 national road toward Peddie. The airport was the hub of the short lived Ciskei International Airways from 1986 to 1989.

Bhisho Airport lies 594 m (1,950 ft) above sea level and has a runway (08/26) that is 2,500 m long.

Sources

References

Airports in South Africa